Elevation is the progressive bluegrass debut album of the Yonder Mountain String Band. It was released in 1999 by Frog Pad Records, an independent record label run by the band. The album features appearances by bluegrass musicians Mike Marshall and Darol Anger.

Track listing

 "Half Moon Rising" – 4:31
 "Mental Breakdown" – 2:57
 "The Bolton Stretch" – 2:45
 "Left Me in a Hole" – 5:25
 "Darkness and Light" – 5:23
 "On the Run" – 3:49
 "Eight Cylinders" – 3:53
 "40 Miles from Denver" – 3:46
 "This Lonesome Heart" – 2:06
 "At the End of the Day" – 3:38
 "Mossy Cow" – 2:46
 "High on a Hilltop" – 2:42
 "To Say Goodbye, to Be Forgiven" – 3:41
 "If There's Still Ramblin' in the Rambler (Let Him Go)" – 2:46
 "Waijal Breakdown" – 6:22

Personnel

Yonder Mountain String Band

 Dave Johnston – banjo, vocals
 Jeff Austin – mandolin, vocals
 Ben Kaufmann – bass, vocals
 Adam Aijala – guitar, vocals, banjo on track 15

Other musicians

 Darol Anger – fiddle on tracks 11 & 15
 Celeste Krenz – additional vocals on track 7
 Mike Marshall – mandolin on track 15
 Sally Van Meter – electric lap slide on track 7, additional vocals on track 7, resophonic guitar on track 8

Technical

 David Glasser – mastering
 Dave Hardy – photography
 James Tuttle – engineer, mixing

References

External links
 Yonder Mountain String Band Homepage

1999 debut albums
Yonder Mountain String Band albums
Frog Pad Records albums